Nootsara Tomkom is a Thai volleyball player. She has been selected to play for the Thailand women's national volleyball team 39 times.

Career
She participated at the 2006 FIVB World Grand Prix.

Tomkom played along Wilavan Apinyapong with the Spanish club IBSA Club Voleibol for the 2007/2008 season of the Spanish Superliga.

Tomkom won the Bronze medal with the Azeri club Rabita Baku in the 2013–14 CEV Champions League after falling 0-3 to the Russian Dinamo Kazan, but defeating 3-0 to the Turkish Eczacıbaşı VitrA Istanbul in the third place placement match. She was awarded tournament's Best Setter.

Rabita Baku, claimed their sixth title championship by winning the 2013–14 Azerbaijani Super League 3-0 to Azeryol Baku and she won the Best Setter award. She also ranked fourth in the 2013-14 Thailand League with Idea Khonkaen.

Tomkom helped Azerrail Baku to win the 2015–16 Azerbaijan Super League championship and she was awarded Best Setter.

In 2018 she played with the local Supreme Chonburi on loan.

She is on the list 2019 Korea-Thailand all star super match competition.

Clubs
  IBSA Club Voleibol (2007–2008)
  Kanti Schaffhausen (2008–2010)
  Azerrail Baku (2010–2012)
  Igtisadchi Baku (2012–2013)
  Rabita Baku (2013–2015)
  Azerrail Baku (2015–2016)
  Fenerbahçe (2016–2018)
  Generali Supreme Chonburi (2018) (loan)
  Nakhon Ratchasima (2018–2020)
  Diamond Food (2020–2021)
  Diamond Food (2022–present)
  Athletes Unlimited Volleyball (2022–present)

Awards

Individual
 2007 Asian Club Championship – "Best Setter"
 2007 Asian Championship – "Best Setter"
 2008 Asian Club Championship – "Best Setter"
 2009 Asian Club Championship – "Best Server"
 2009 Asian Championship – "Best Setter"
 2010 Asian Club Championship – "Most Valuable Player"
 2011 Asian Club Championship – "Best Server"
 2012 Asian Club Championship – "Best Server"
 2012 World Olympic Qualification – "Best Setter"
 2012 FIVB World Grand Prix – "Best Setter"
 2012 Asian Cup – "Best Setter"
 2013 Asian Championship – "Best Setter"
 2013–14 CEV Champions League – "Best Setter"
 2014–15 Azerbaijan Super League – "Best Setter"
 2015–16 Azerbaijan Super League – "Best Setter"
 2016 Montreux Volley Masters – "Best Setter"
 2016 FIVB World Grand Prix – "Best Setter"
 2017 Asian Championship – "Best Setter"
 2019 Asian Championship – "Best Setter"

Clubs
 2010–11 Thailand League –  Champion, with Kathu Phuket
 2010–11 Azerbaijan Super League –  Runner-up, with Azerrail Baku
 2011–12 Azerbaijan Super League –  Runner-up, with Azerrail Baku
 2012–13 Azerbaijan Super League –  Runner-up, with Igtisadchi Baku
 2013 Thai–Denmark Super League –  Champion, with Idea Khonkaen
 2013-14 Azerbaijan Super League –  Champion, with Rabita Baku 
 2014–15 Azerbaijan Super League –  Champion, with Rabita Baku
 2015–16 Azerbaijan Super League -  Champion, with Azerrail Baku
 2016-17 Turkish Cup -  Champion, with Fenerbahçe
 2016–17 Turkish League –  Champion, with Fenerbahçe
 2018–19 Thailand League –  Champion, with Nakhon Ratchasima
 2007 Asian Club Championship –  Runner-up, with Sang Som
 2008 Asian Club Championship –  Runner-up, with Sang Som
 2009 Asian Club Championship –  Champion, with Federbrau
 2010 Asian Club Championship –   Champion, with Federbrau
 2011 Asian Club Championship –   Champion, with Chang
 2012 Asian Club Championship –  Bronze medal, with Chang
 2018 Asian Club Championship -  Champion, with Supreme Chonburi
 2010–11 Challenge Cup –  Champion, with Azerrail Baku
 2013–14 CEV Champions League –  Bronze medal, with Rabita Baku

Royal decorations
 2013 -  Commander (Third Class) of The Most Exalted Order of the White Elephant
 2010 -  Companion (Fourth Class) of The Most Admirable Order of the Direkgunabhorn

References

1985 births
Living people
Nootsara Tomkom
Nootsara Tomkom
Asian Games medalists in volleyball
Volleyball players at the 2006 Asian Games
Volleyball players at the 2010 Asian Games
Volleyball players at the 2014 Asian Games
Volleyball players at the 2018 Asian Games
Setters (volleyball)
Fenerbahçe volleyballers
Igtisadchi Baku volleyball players
Thai expatriate sportspeople in Azerbaijan
Thai expatriate sportspeople in Turkey
Thai expatriate sportspeople in Spain
Thai autobiographers
Nootsara Tomkom
Nootsara Tomkom
Nootsara Tomkom
Medalists at the 2014 Asian Games
Medalists at the 2018 Asian Games
Universiade medalists in volleyball
Nootsara Tomkom
Southeast Asian Games medalists in volleyball
Women autobiographers
Nootsara Tomkom
Competitors at the 2001 Southeast Asian Games
Competitors at the 2003 Southeast Asian Games
Competitors at the 2005 Southeast Asian Games
Competitors at the 2007 Southeast Asian Games
Competitors at the 2009 Southeast Asian Games
Competitors at the 2011 Southeast Asian Games
Competitors at the 2013 Southeast Asian Games
Competitors at the 2015 Southeast Asian Games
Competitors at the 2017 Southeast Asian Games
Universiade bronze medalists for Thailand
Competitors at the 2019 Southeast Asian Games
Medalists at the 2013 Summer Universiade
Expatriate volleyball players in Spain
Expatriate volleyball players in Azerbaijan
Expatriate volleyball players in Turkey
Thai expatriate sportspeople in the United States
Expatriate volleyball players in the United States